Androcalva procumbens is a species of flowering plant in the family Malvaceae and is endemic to central New South Wales. It is a prostrate shrub covered with star-shaped hairs, and with slender, trailing stems, egg-shaped to narrowly egg-shaped or lance-shaped leaves with scalloped or lobed edges, and clusters of 4 to 10 white, pink and yellow flowers.

Description
The edges of the leaves are scalloped, lobed or regularly toothed, the lower surface densely covered with woolly, white hairs. There are up to 3 egg-shaped staminodes between each pair of stamens.

Taxonomy
This species was first formally described in 1898 by Joseph Maiden and Ernst Betche who gave it the name Rulingia procumbens in Proceedings of the Linnean Society of New South Wales. In 2011, Carolyn Wilkins and Barbara Whitlock assigned it to the new genus Androcalva in Australian Systematic Botany. The specific epithet (procumbens) means "procumbent".

Distribution and habitat
Androcalva procumbens grows in sandy soil mainly in the Dubbo, Mendooran and Gilgandra districts, but also in the Pilliga and Nymagee districts in central New South Wales.

Conservation status
Androcalva procumbens is listed as "vulnerable" under the Australian Government Environment Protection and Biodiversity Conservation Act 1999.

References

procumbens
Flora of New South Wales
Plants described in 1898
Taxa named by Joseph Maiden
Taxa named by Ernst Betche